Serik Temirzhanov (born 24 May 1998) is a Kazakhstani boxer. He competed in the men's featherweight event at the 2020 Summer Olympics held in Tokyo, Japan. He also competed at the 2021 World Championships, where he won a medal.

References 

Living people
Place of birth missing (living people)
Kazakhstani male boxers
Featherweight boxers
Olympic boxers of Kazakhstan
Boxers at the 2020 Summer Olympics
AIBA World Boxing Championships medalists
1998 births
21st-century Kazakhstani people